The Blériot 110 (or Blériot-Zappata 110) was a French aircraft built in 1930 to attempt new world aerial distance records.

Design and development 
Built specifically at the request of the ordered by the Service Technique of the French
Air Ministry. it was a two-seat high-wing monoplane constructed of wood. 
The fuselage was a stressed-skin structure with a teardrop-shaped cross section, with two upper longerons and a ventral keel: the load-bearing covering consisted of three layers of whitewood strips.
 
It was fitted with six fuel tanks in the wings and four in the fuselage, holding a total of 6,000 L (1,319 Imperial gallons or 1,585 US gal). Because the pilot and co-pilots seats were behind the fuselage fuel tanks, a periscope was fitted for take-offs and landings.  A sleeping couch was fitted behind the co-pilot's station so one of the  crew members could sleep on long-distance flights.

The aircraft's first flight on 16 May 1930 was cut short by a fuel supply problem, although no damage was sustained. After repairs, it was taken to Oran, Algeria, to make an attempt on the closed-circuit distance record. By this time, the aircraft had been named Joseph Le Brix in honour of the pilot who had died flying the 110's rival, the Dewoitine D.33.

Further records were attempted over the next two years, but these were proved unsuccessful, and the 110 was scrapped.

Specifications

See also

References

Notes

Bibliography
 
 

High-wing aircraft
Single-engined tractor aircraft
1930s French experimental aircraft
110
Aircraft first flown in 1930